Isoplenodia is a genus of moths in the family Geometridae. It formerly consisted of only one species, Isoplenodia arrogans, found on Madagascar, but new species were described in 2010.

Species
Isoplenodia arabukoensis Sihvonen & Staude, 2010
Isoplenodia arrogans Prout, 1932
Isoplenodia kisubiensis Sihvonen & Staude, 2010
Isoplenodia vidalensis Sihvonen & Staude, 2010

References

Citations

Bibliography
 ;  2010: Revision of Isoplenodia Prout, 1932 with new records from continental Africa (Lepidoptera: Geometridae, Sterrhinae). Zootaxa, 2453: 25–41. Preview

External links
Natural History Museum Lepidoptera genus database

Moths described in 1932
Scopulini